Manqabadi (also spelled Manqbadi, Mankabadi, Mankbadi, among other variations) is an Egyptian surname and is a derivative of the city of Manqabad. It means "from Manqabad."

People
Notable people with the surname include:

Albert Selim El-Mankabadi, Egyptian rower
Reda R. Mankbadi, professor
Samir Mankabady, lawyer

See also
Manqabad, a town in Upper Egypt, near the city of Asyut

References

Arabic-language surnames
Patronymic surnames